Clement Mudford (21 January 1915 – 10 March 1977) was an Australian sports shooter. He competed in the trap event at the 1956 Summer Olympics.

References

1915 births
1977 deaths
Australian male sport shooters
Olympic shooters of Australia
Shooters at the 1956 Summer Olympics
20th-century Australian people